Carlos De Valdez (19 March 1894 – 30 October 1939) was a Peruvian-American film actor who appeared in around forty American films.

De Valdez died in the Encino neighborhood of Los Angeles at the age of 45.

Partial filmography
 Paris Interlude (1934)
 The Prescott Kid (1934)
 The Florentine Dagger (1935)
 Bonnie Scotland (1935)
 Robin Hood of El Dorado (1936)
 The Bold Cavalier (1936)
 Men in Exile (1937)
 Old Louisiana (1937)
 Drums of Destiny (1937)
 The Last Train from Madrid (1937)
 Lancer Spy (1937)
 Conquest (1937)
 Romance in the Dark (1938)
 Blockade (1938)
 Suez (1938)
 The Llano Kid (1939)

References

Bibliography
 Pitts, Michael R. Western Movies: A Guide to 5,105 Feature Films. McFarland, 2012.

External links

1894 births
1939 deaths
Peruvian male film actors
Peruvian emigrants to the United States
People from Arica
20th-century Peruvian male actors